Kashama is a surname. Notable people with the surname include:

Alain Kashama (born 1979), American and Canadian football player
Fernand Kashama (born 1985), Canadian football player
Hakeem Kashama (born 1978), Canadian football player
Kalonji Kashama (born 1991), Canadian football player